Shalheh-ye Hajji Hoseyn (also Romanized as Shalḩeh-ye Ḩājjī Ḩoseyn and  Shalheh Hājī Hoseyn; also known as Hājī Hoseyn, Ḩājjī Ḩoseyn, and Shalheh-ye Ḩājj Ḩoseyn) is a village in Shalahi Rural District, in the Central District of Abadan County, Khuzestan Province, Iran. At the 2006 census, its population was 797, in 149 families.

References 

Populated places in Abadan County